Hosur municipal Corporation's logo

Winners

MuchMusic Video Awards